The 2014 St. Francis Brooklyn Terriers men's soccer team represented St. Francis College during the 2014 NCAA Division I men's soccer season. The Terrier's home games were played at Brooklyn Bridge Park, Pier 5. The team has been a member of the Northeast Conference since 1981 and is coached by Tom Giovatto, who is in his eighth year at the helm of the Terriers.

St. Francis Brooklyn finished the regular season at 9–5–4 and conference play at 4–1–2 qualifying for the NEC Tournament with the 3rd seed. In the semi-finals against the Bryant Bulldogs, St. Francis won 2-0 with both goals coming from Junior Midfielder Vincent Bezecourt. In the Championship game, the Terriers defeated the Saint Francis Red Flash in Loretto, PA 2–1 in OT, with the golden goal scored on a free kick from 15 yards out in the 94th minute by Senior Co-Captain Andy Cormack. Cormack also scored the golden goal via a free kick in last year's championship game against the Bryant Bulldogs. Cormack was named the NEC Tournament's Most Valuable Player and named to College Soccer News National Team of the Week. With the NEC Championship the Terriers qualified for their second consecutive NCAA Tournament where they faced Old Dominion in the first round and lost 0-3.

After the season, 3 members of the 2014 Northeast Conference Champion St. Francis Brooklyn Terriers men's soccer team were named to the 2014 National Soccer Coaches Association of America's All-Northeast Region team. Senior defender Riccardo Milano and junior goal keeper Jack Binks were named to the second team, while junior midfielder Vincent Bezecourt received third team honors.

2014 squad
As of September 2, 2014.

Captains in bold

Schedule 

|-
!colspan=6 style="background:#0038A8; border: 2px solid #CE1126;color:#FFFFFF;"| Non-Conference Regular Season
|-

|-
!colspan=6 style="background:#0038A8; border: 2px solid #CE1126;color:#FFFFFF;"| Northeast Conference Regular Season
|-

|-
!colspan=12 style="background:#0038A8; border: 2px solid #CE1126;color:#FFFFFF;"| Northeast Conference Tournament

|-
!colspan=12 style="background:#0038A8; border: 2px solid #CE1126;color:#FFFFFF;"| NCAA Tournament
|-
 
|-

2014 NSCAA/Continental Tire College rankings

See also 
 2014 Northeast Conference men's soccer season
 2014 NCAA Division I men's soccer season
 Northeast Conference Men's Soccer Tournament
 2014 NCAA Division I Men's Soccer Championship

References 

St. Francis Brooklyn Terriers
St. Francis Brooklyn Terriers men's soccer seasons
St. Francis Brooklyn Terriers
St. Francis Brooklyn Terriers